Gilbert De Rieck (born 28 September 1936) is a former Belgian cyclist. He competed in the sprint event at the 1960 Summer Olympics.

References

External links
 

1936 births
Living people
Belgian male cyclists
Cyclists at the 1960 Summer Olympics
Olympic cyclists of Belgium
People from Merelbeke
Cyclists from East Flanders